Sultan Ahmed bin Sulayem (Arabic: ‏ ‏سلطان أحمد بن سليم, born 1955) is an Emirati businessman. He is the chairman and chief executive officer (CEO) of DP World and the chairman of the Ports, Customs & Free Zone Corporation.

Family and education
The Sulayem family has been one of Dubai's most prominent business and political families since at least the early 20th century. Ahmed bin Sulayem's father was a key advisor to Dubai's ruling Maktoum family.  

He has a bachelor's degree in economics from Temple University in Philadelphia.

Business career
Bin Sulayem worked as a customs officer at Dubai's port after graduating from college in the late 1970s. He was appointed by Sheikh Mohammed bin Rashid Al Maktoum to be chairman of the Jebel Ali Free Zone (JAFZA) in 1985. He oversaw its rapid expansion, with JAFZA growing from hosting 19 companies in the mid-1980s to roughly 7500 as of 2020.

Bin Sulayem was made DP World chairman in 2007 and was appointed group chairman and CEO in February 2016. Following the acquisition of British port operator Peninsular & Oriental Steam Navigation for $6.9 billion, DP World became the world’s third biggest port operator in 2010, and has remained in the top three since. DP World expanded its business in July 2021 with the purchase of American global logistics provider Syncreon Holdings for $1.2 billion. 

Bin Sulayem led DP World's property development subsidiary Nakheel until 2010, becoming a board member in 2020. The company was behind the construction of man-made islands in Dubai. He helped establish and headed the DP World subsidiary private equity fund Istithmar World.

He has been non-executive chairman of Virgin Hyperloop since 2018. He is a board member of the Dubai Executive Council and the UAE Federal Tax Authority, as well as the Investment Corporation of Dubai (the emirate's sovereign wealth fund) until 2009.

Recognition

He was awarded an honorary doctorate from Middlesex University in Dubai in 2008.

Personal life
Bin Sulayem owns hotels on Nakheel's Palm islands, and a stake in a real estate brokerage company.

His son, Ahmed Sultan Bin Sulayem, is the chairman of the government-owned Dubai Multi Commodities Centre.

References 

1955 births
Living people
Emirati businesspeople
Temple University alumni
People from Dubai
Asian Games medalists in equestrian
Equestrians at the 2006 Asian Games
Asian Games bronze medalists for the United Arab Emirates
Medalists at the 2006 Asian Games